The Venezuelan Cycling Federation (in Spanish: Federación Venezolana de Ciclismo) is the national governing body of cycle racing in Venezuela.

It is a member of the UCI and COPACI.

External links
Venezuelan Cycling Federation official website

Cycle racing organizations
Cycle racing in Venezuela
Cycling